The 18th New Brunswick Legislative Assembly represented New Brunswick between June 24, 1857, and May 14, 1861.

The assembly sat at the pleasure of the Governor of New Brunswick John Henry Thomas Manners-Sutton.

James A. Harding was chosen as speaker for the house. In 1859, John M. Johnson was chosen as speaker after Harding resigned his seat.

List of members

Notes:

References
Journal of the House of Assembly of ... New Brunswick from ... June to ... July, 1857 ... (1857)

Terms of the New Brunswick Legislature
1860 in Canada
1861 in Canada
1857 in Canada
1858 in Canada
1859 in Canada
1857 establishments in New Brunswick
1861 disestablishments in New Brunswick